"Good-bye days" is the fifth major label single released by Japanese artist Yui. It was released on 14 June 2006 under Sony Records. She credits the song as "for Amane Kaoru / for 雨音薫" because the song was the main theme song for Midnight Sun in which Yui also plays the leading role of Kaoru Amane. The B-side, "Skyline", was also used for the movie as an insert song. "It's Happy Line" is actually the title track of her first single, which was an indie release.

Track listing

Oricon Sales Chart (Japan)

References

2006 singles
Yui (singer) songs
Songs written by Yui (singer)
Japanese film songs